Mayaula Mayoni (1945 - 2010) was a soukous recording artist, composer and vocalist, in the Democratic Republic of the Congo (DRC). He was once a member of the soukous band TPOK Jazz, led by François Luambo Makiadi, which dominated the Congolese music scene from the 1950s through the 1980s.
One of the best compositions of the late Mayaula Mayoni was Cherie Bondowe

See also
 Franco Luambo Makiadi
 Sam Mangwana
 Josky Kiambukuta
 Simaro Lutumba
 Ndombe Opetum
 Youlou Mabiala
 Mose Fan Fan
 Wuta Mayi
 TPOK Jazz
 List of African musicians

References

External links
 Overview of Composition of TPOK Jazz

Democratic Republic of the Congo musicians
Soukous musicians
2010 deaths
1945 births
TPOK Jazz members
21st-century Democratic Republic of the Congo people